The Cathedral Church of St David in Hobart is the principal Anglican church in Tasmania, Australia. The dean (as of March 2009) is the Very Reverend Richard Humphrey.

Consecrated in 1874, St David's is the seat of the Bishop of Tasmania. It is a cathedral because it is the location of the bishop's cathedra or throne. It is the venue for great occasions of diocese, city and state.

Mission 

The mission of St David's is "Proclaiming Jesus as Lord in the Heart of Hobart to build a community of living faith, profound hope and practical love."

Description 

The building sits on the corner of Macquarie and Murray Streets and forms one quadrant of what is considered to be the finest Georgian streetscape in Australia. On the pinnacles of each gable is a quatrefoil, repeated on the extremities of the large crucifix of the rood screen which dominates the sanctuary.

The cathedral choir offers sacred music both classical and contemporary in worship and in concert. The organ, considered one of the superior organs of Australia, which was originally in the earlier cathedral, was a two-manual made by Bishop & Starr of London. Expanded in 1916 to a three-manual by George Fincham & Sons of Melbourne, it was rebuilt again in 1958 by J. W. Walker & Sons Ltd of London, and renovated between 1999 and 2005 by Gibbs & Thomson. The acoustics and 650 seating capacity demand frequent concerts. Appearances of the Tasmanian Symphony Orchestra, Hobart City Band, massed military bands, the Royal Copenhagen Chapel Choir and the Sydney Brass Quintet were features of 2008.

Most of the bells are from 1935 (with several newer bells installed in 2005) and all were founded by John Taylor & Co. They are rung by members of The Australian and New Zealand Association of Bellringers.

St David's is known for its contemporary Anglican liturgy. Linked with England's Coventry Cathedral, the dean and associate clergy are "committed to creative liturgies that lift the heart and proclaim the Biblical faith as our society, increasingly dissatisfied with a purely materialistic world view, seeks a sense of the transcendent and apprehension of a living spirituality."

This desire for a "living spirituality" is reflected in the cathedral's commitment to serve the city, state and community. In services from those for the opening of law term, the opening of parliament, Heart Foundation, the Cancer Council Tasmania, Battle of Britain, Anzac Day, Hutchins and Collegiate schools and as a venue for state secondary and senior secondary schools the tranquillity and peace is often suspended with laughter, tears and memories.

The memorial service for the Port Arthur tragedy is remembered in the Hope Chapel. A memorial to the last ANZAC soldier, Alec Campbell, who died on 16 May 2002, aged 103, is also in the cathedral.

History 

In 1842 Hobart was declared a city and the existing St David's Church became St David's Cathedral. The Reverend Francis Russell Nixon was appointed first Bishop of Tasmania and Frederick Holdship Cox the first Dean of St David's.

The foundation stone of a new cathedral was laid in January 1868 by Prince Alfred, Duke of Edinburgh, a son of Queen Victoria, and it was built between then and 1936, in the Gothic Revival style, to a design by the English architect George Frederick Bodley. There are flags dating from the time when Tasmania stopped being a convict settlement. The stained-glass windows depict saints, knights, kings and biblical characters. Small memorial plaques along the walls are dedicated to deceased residents of Tasmania.

The cathedral's distinctive features include an arcaded entrance with a large west window and buttressed turrets; a square tower made of Oatlands stone; and a close on the southern side with old trees. The building is on the Register of the National Estate.

Deans

See also
List of tallest buildings in Hobart

References

External links

 

19th-century Anglican church buildings
1874 establishments in Australia
Anglican cathedrals in Australia
Anglicanism
Cathedrals in Tasmania
Churches in Hobart
George Frederick Bodley church buildings
Gothic Revival architecture in Hobart
Gothic Revival church buildings in Australia
Tasmanian Heritage Register
Macquarie Street, Hobart